Svrljig Mountains (Serbian Cyrillic:) is a mountain in eastern Serbia, between towns of Svrljig at northwest and Bela Palanka at southeast. Its highest peak Zeleni vrh has an elevation of 1,334 meters above sea level. The peak Pleš (1,267 m) lies close to Niška Banja.

References

Mountains of Serbia